3C 449 is a low-redshift (z = 0.017)  Fanaroff and Riley class I radio galaxy. It is thought to contain a highly warped circumnuclear disk surrounding the central active galactic nucleus (AGN). The name signifies that it was the 449th object (ordered by right ascension) of the Third Cambridge Catalog of Radio Sources (3C), published in 1959.

References

External links
 Radio images and data from the 3CRR Atlas
 Astrophysical Journal article about 3C 449 (Tremblay et al. 2006)
 Simbad 3C 449

Radio galaxies
449
Lacerta (constellation)